Johnny Gill (born 1966) is an American R&B singer-songwriter.

Johnny Gill may also refer to:
Johnny Gill (baseball) (1905–1984), Major League Baseball outfielder 
Johnny Gill (1983 album)
Johnny Gill (1990 album)
Johnny Ray Gill, (born 1985), American producer, stage and screen actor and director

See also
John Gill (disambiguation)

Gill, Johnny